All Rome residents who are at least 18 years old and hold an EU citizenship are eligible to vote for the Mayor and the 48 members of the Capitoline Assembly, as well as for the President and the 30 or 40 members of the Council of the Municipality where they reside.

Since 1993 Italian mayors are elected directly. In all the cities with a population higher than 15,000 the voters express a choice for a mayor-candidate and/or for a party or civic list, not necessarily linked to the same mayor-candidate (voto disgiunto). If no mayor-candidate receives an absolute majority, the top two candidates go to a runoff election (ballottaggio) after two weeks. The City Council and Municipalities Councils elections are based on a proportional system with preferences: for each list, the candidates with the most preferences are elected proportionally to the seats assigned to the list, with the lists supporting the elected mayor being granted around 60% of the total seats to guarantee governability.

Elections are scheduled every five years, usually between 15 April and 15 June. The last election was held in June 2016.

Elections during the Italian Republic (since 1946)

City Council election, 1946

The first democratic election after the fall of fascism took place on 10 November 1946.

After the Liberation of Rome on 4 June 1944, Independent nobleman Filippo Andrea VI Doria Pamphili had been appointed as Provisional Mayor by the National Liberation Committee under approval of the United Nations military government. When the authority of the Italian government was restored in 1946, local elections in the whole country were called.

Proportional representation and Westminster system were the principles chosen to restore municipal democracy in Italy.

No clear winner emerged from the election and no force was able to achieve the 41 seats needed for an overall majority. The unitary left-wing list formed by socialists and communists won the largest number of votes and seats but still fell 11 seats short from an absolute majority. The right-wing populist movement Common Man's Front, founded in February that year by the comedian Guglielmo Giannini, performed well and came second, surpassing for just a few votes the catholic Christian Democracy.

Coalition talks began immediately but the reaction of a stable alliance failed. On 10 December 1946 the City Council elected Salvatore Rebecchini (DC) as new Mayor of Rome, but after two weeks he resigned due to the impossibility to form a stable executive board, paving the way for a snap election.

Sunday 10 November 1946. Sources: La Stampa , 1946–1955 Local Elections (Italian)

City Council election, 1947
The snap election took place on 12 October 1947.

As for the previous municipal election, no clear winner emerged from the competition. The left-wing Bloc of the People list gained again the most seats. Differently from the 1946 election, the Common Man's Front did poorly and lost more than half of its votes, while Christian Democracy enforced its position making a net gain of 10 seats with more than 32% of votes.

As a result of the election, on 5 November 1947 the City Council re-elected Salvatore Rebecchini (DC) as Mayor. Rebecchini obtained 41 votes out of 80 and his election was made possible thanks to the support of the neo-fascist Italian Social Movement. He formed a centre-right municipal executive board composed by DC, UQ and PLI.

Sunday 12 October 1947. Sources: La Stampa , 1946–1955 Local Elections (Italian)

City Council election, 1952
The election took place on 25 May 1952.

National political situation had deeply changed during the previous five years. In 1951 Alcide De Gasperi's government changed the local electoral law to a block voting system, to ensure the leadership of its local administrations: two thirds of the seats would be ensured to the winning coalition, abolishing the proportional representation.

The election saw a considerable and unprecedented intervention from the Vatican to secretly influence the electoral outcome. Pope Pius XII was rather distrustful of De Gasperi and Christian Democracy, considering the party indecisive and fractious – reformist currents within it particularly, which tended to the moderate left. On the eve of the municipal election, in which again the Communist and Socialist parties threatened to win out, he used informal connections to make his views known. The pope stated that the war against communism was a holy war and excommunicated members of the Italian Communist Party. Having decided to encourage the Christian democrats to consider a political alliance with the right-wing parties as part of an anti-communist coalition, he asked the Jesuit Father Riccardo Lombardi to speak with De Gasperi and convince him to consider such an alliance – an electoral alliance with those even of monarchist and neo-fascist tendencies –including the neo-fascist Italian Social Movement. Adopting a domino theory he warned that, if "the Communists win in Rome, in Italy, it will cast a shadow on the entire world: France would become Communist, and then Spain and then all of Europe". De Gasperi instead rejected the idea as politically dangerous to the long term fortunes of his party and sustained a centrist electoral alliance.

In the election the centrist coalition obtained an absolute majority. The incumbent Mayor Salvatore Rebecchini was re-elected at the head of an executive formed by DC, PSDI, PRI and PLI.

Sunday 25 May 1952. Sources: La Stampa , 1946–1955 Local Elections (Italian)

City Council election, 1956
The election took place on 27 May 1956.

Again the electoral system for local elections had been changed: after Alcide De Gasperi's government had retired in 1953 the 1951-electoral law based on a block voting system, the previous electoral system based on a proportional representation was restored. This election was anticipated by the effect of a new disposition which ordered a new 4 years-term legislature.

For the first time communists and socialists run separately, undermining their possibilities to won the plurality of votes, as it happened in the previous municipal elections. The centrist coalition was confirmed again as the strongest political alliance in the City Council, despite the electoral campaign had been deeply influenced by the scandal of the building speculation denounced by the prominent magazine L'espresso.

On 2 July 1956 Umberto Tupini (DC) was elected Mayor at the head of a centrist executive composed by DC, PLI and PSDI.

Sunday 27 May 1956. Source: La Stampa

City Council election, 1960

The election took place on 6 November 1960.

The centrist coalition which had run the local administration during the 1960 Summer Olympics was confirmed again as the strongest political alliance in the City Council.

The incumbent mayor Urbano Ciocchetti (DC), who succeeded Tupini in 1958, was re-elected at the head of a minority centre-right executive formed by DC and PLI with the external support of PSDI and PRI. However, in July 1961 Ciocchetti resigned due to a political crisis, paving the way for another snap election.

Sunday 6 November 1960. Source: La Stampa

City Council election, 1962
The snap election took place on 10 June 1962.

After one year of commissarial tenure resulted from the deep political crisis of the centrist coalition, the election led to the formation of the first centre-left executive in the history of the city, formed by DC, PSDI, PRI and PSI.

On 17 July 1962 Glauco Della Porta (DC) was elected Mayor by the City Council with 40 votes out of 80.

Sunday 10 June 1962. Source: La Stampa

City Council election, 1966
The election took place on 12 June 1966.

Despite considerable losses for the Italian Socialist Party, the centre-left coalition in its complex won the majority of seats in the City Council (41 out of 80). However the election saw the incredible surge of the centre-right Italian Liberal Party, which obtained more than 10% of votes and managed to become for the first time the third party in a Roman municipal election. This exceptional growth of the liberals – and the contemporary defeat of the Italian Socialist Party – can be explained by the poor economic results of the first centre-left national government and by the ability of the liberal leader Giovanni Malagodi to draw some votes from the Italian Social Movement and the Monarchist Party, whose electoral base was composed also by conservatives suspicious of the socialists.

Sunday 12 June 1966. Source: La Stampa

City Council election, 1971

The election took place on 13 June 1971.

The centre-left coalition obtained again the majority of seats in the City Council. However the incumbent Mayor Clelio Darida (DC) decided to dismiss the alliance and form a minority executive composed only by members of the Christian Democracy with the external support of minor parties.

Sunday 13 June 1971. Source: La Stampa

City Council election, 1976

The election took place on 20 June 1976.

Similarly to the previous year municipal elections which saw the unprecedented win of left-wing parties across the country, the Italian Communist Party became for the first time in history the first party with 35% of the votes. This extraordinary result led to the birth of the first red-giunta in the history of the city: the new coalition was formed by the leftist Socialist and Communist Party.

On 9 August 1976 the notorious left-wing independent art historian Giulio Carlo Argan was elected Mayor.

Sunday 20 June 1976. Source: La Stampa

City Council election, 1981
The election took place on 21 June 1981.

The left-wing coalition formed by communists and socialists won a decisive absolute majority of seats in the City Council.

Sunday 21 June 1981. Source: La Stampa

City Council election, 1985
The election took place on 12 May 1985.

After the death of the incumbent communist Mayor Luigi Petroselli, his successor Ugo Vetere (PCI) was increasingly under the attack of Christian Democracy, which asked for his resignation in October 1984.

The election resulted in a defeat for the left-wing coalition. On 30 July 1985 Nicola Signorello (DC) was elected new Mayor at the head of a centre-left executive formed by the members of the Pentapartito coalition.

Sunday 12 May 1985. Source: La Stampa

City Council election, 1989

The snap election took place on 29 October 1989.

After a scandal related to the school canteens management, the incumbent Mayor Pietro Giubilo was forced to resign and, since the city Council failed to elected his successor, a snap election was called. Pentapartito alliance retained the majority of seats in the City Council and on 19 December 1989 elected the socialist sport manager Franco Carraro as new Mayor.

Sunday 29 October 1989. Source: La Stampa

Mayoral and City Council election, 1993

Mayoral and City Council election, 1997

Mayoral and City Council election, 2001

Mayoral and City Council election, 2006

Mayoral and City Council election, 2008

Mayoral and City Council election, 2013

Mayoral and City Council election, 2016

Mayoral and City Council election, 2021

References

 
Rome
Rome
Politics of Lazio
21st century in Rome
Elections in Lazio